ŠK Milenium 2000 Bardejovská Nová Ves is a Slovak football team, based in borough Bardejovská Nová Ves, of city Bardejov.

History 
The club was founded on 25 July 1962. The first chairman was Tomáš Maxin.

References

External links 
at obfzbardejov.sk 

Milenium Bardejovska Nova Ves
Association football clubs established in 1962
1962 establishments in Slovakia